The Bezirk Magdeburg was a district (Bezirk) of East Germany. The administrative seat and the main town was Magdeburg.

History
The district was established, with the other 13, on 25 July 1952, substituting the old German states. After 3 October 1990 it was abolished as part of the process of German reunification, becoming again part of the state of Saxony-Anhalt except Havelberg district, passed to Brandenburg.

Geography

Position
The Bezirk Magdeburg bordered with the Bezirke of Schwerin, Potsdam, Halle and Erfurt. It bordered also with West Germany.

Subdivision
The Bezirk was divided into 22 Kreise: 1 urban district (Stadtkreis) and 21 rural districts (Landkreise): 
Urban district : Magdeburg.
Rural districts : Burg; Gardelegen; Genthin; Halberstadt; Haldensleben; Havelberg; Kalbe; Klötze; Loburg; Oschersleben; Osterburg; Salzwedel; Schönebeck; Seehausen; Staßfurt; Stendal; Tangerhütte; Wanzleben; Wernigerode; Wolmirstedt; Zerbst.

See also
Regierungsbezirk Magdeburg

References

External links

Magdeburg
Former states and territories of Saxony-Anhalt
History of Magdeburg
20th century in Saxony-Anhalt